Pallavi Fauzdar (born 20 December 1979) is an Indian woman best known for her high altitude motorcycle riding and her social work. Her exploits have been recognised by a number of firsts in the Limca Book of Records.

Early life and background
Pallavi Fauzdar was born in Agra, Uttar Pradesh, India. Her father is Ashok Fauzdar, a retired electrical engineer. She first showed interest in riding motorcycles at the age of 14, riding her father’s motorcycle. She married in 2004, has 2 children and lives in New Delhi.

Career
Pallavi Fauzdar started her riding career by joining a riding group in New Delhi. Her first notable exploit was in 2015, a solo ride to Mana Pass at an altitude of 5638m or 18774 ft above sea level, then the highest motorable pass in the world. Her feat was recognised by the Limca Book of Records. That year she created another record by riding to eight mountain passes above 5000m in a single trip. Pallavi then continued to ride in mountains covering new passes and remote routes. She also did social work by doing cause-awareness rides in various parts of the country. In 2017 Pallavi rode to the Ladakh region of India and scaled the Umling La Pass at 5803m or 19323 ft, the first person to do so. The Umling La pass is now the world's highest motorable pass.

Records
Pallavi currently holds the following Limca Book records:

Recognition and awards
Pallavi’s work and achievements have been recognized at the national level and she has received the following awards:

Social work
Pallavi has worked with Non-governmental organisations and the Women and Child Department of Government of the State of UP as brand Ambassador of Women and Child Helpline 181 and "Beti Bachao, Beti Padhao" campaign for the support of women and children.

Television
Pallavi regularly gives media interviews on television and to media houses including DD National.

References

External links

Motorcycling articles needing expert attention
1979 births
Living people
Sportswomen from Uttar Pradesh
Indian racing drivers
People from Agra
Women motorcyclists
21st-century Indian women
21st-century Indian people
Nari Shakti Puraskar winners